Francis Neale Smith (December 26, 1930 – August 15, 2020) was a rear admiral in the United States Navy. He was Chief of the United States Naval Reserve from November 1987 until August 1989. He was an alumnus of the University of Maryland School of Law, and Loyola College in Maryland.

After his retirement in 1989, Smith became director of the United States Navy Memorial in Washington, D.C. Later in life, he moved to The Woodlands, Texas with his wife Virginia Elizabeth "Ginny" Smith, a retired Navy nurse. Smith had married the former Virginia Elizabeth "Ginger" Thompson on August 6, 1955 at the Charleston Naval Base chapel.

References

1930 births
2020 deaths
Loyola University Maryland alumni
University of Maryland Francis King Carey School of Law alumni
United States Navy admirals
People from The Woodlands, Texas
Military personnel from Texas